The Tuntsayoki is a river in the south of the Kola Peninsula in Murmansk Oblast, Russia. The Tuntsayoki originates in the forests of Finland and flows into the river Tumcha. Its biggest tributary is the Vatsimanyoki.

Rivers of Murmansk Oblast
Rivers of Finland
Rivers of Salla
International rivers of Europe